Mordellistena intermixta is a species of beetle in the family Mordellidae. It is in the genus Mordellistena. It was discovered in 1865.

References

intermixta